This is an article about the history of female Go players in Asia and Europe.

Social background
Female Go players are viewed to be a minority. This is due to these reasons: 
 There are many male players but only few female players.
 In Japan, there are no female winners at games without gender rules. Asami Ueno was the first female player who managed to be a finalist.
 In China, there was no female 9-dan before Rui Naiwei.
 Most players and winners at World championships are male.
 Not all female players are fairly paid. Joanne Missingham is known for her protests to this issue.

Comparison with female shogi players
In Japan, Go players are always compared with shogi players. This is because newspapers like The Asahi Shimbun treat them equal. But there is a big difference among female players. Female Go players usually belong to the same organization with others. But this does not happen for shogi. Female shogi players belong to the Ladies Professional Shogi Association (LPSA). The others belong to the Japan Shogi Association (JSA). Some LPSA players like Kana Satomi have tried to enter JSA. But currently, no one has entered.

Promotion of female players

Europe

In Europe, there were no notable female players before Svetlana Shikshina and Diana Koszegi. In order to increase the number of female players, the European Go Federation is holding the European Women's Go Championship (EWGC) since 1996 and the European Pair Go Championship (EPGC) since 1997.

Japan
Kansai Ki-in has eased the age rules to female players. At Nihon Ki-in, there is a special exam for female players. Most female professionals (except Xie Yimin etc.) have got their pro status by this way. In 2019, Nihon Ki-in has started a female player test system to give more support to them. Nihon Ki-in is also sponsoring female amateur games.

Female Student Honinbo

This is a tournament operated with the All Japan Student Go Federation. Some winners have got pro status, or became top amateur players. Only players who cleared regional games can attend.

All Japan Female Amateur Go Championship

The All Japan Female Amateur Go Championship is the highest match for female amateur Go players. Some winners have become a pro. The next table shows the notable winners.

Kaori Chinen, Yukari Yoshihara and Rina Fujisawa also participated in this championship before becoming a pro.

References

 
History of Go
Sportswomen